KIZN is a commercial radio station located in Boise, Idaho, broadcasting on 92.3 FM.  KIZN airs a country music format branded as Kissin 92.3.

History

Early years (1967-1978) 
The station was launched in December 1967 as KATN-FM. On August 1, 1968, the call letters were changed to KBBK.

Top 40 (1978-1990)
On January 2, 1978, KBBK flipped to a new Top 40 format branded as Magic 92, one of the first full-time FM Top 40 stations in the Boise market. In 1984, KBBK changed their call letters to KIYS and rebranded as 92 Kiss FM.

Country (1990-present) 
In 1990, the station switched to country format as Kissin' 92, and changed the call letters to KIZN. The switch left Boise without a CHR station appealing younger listeners for the next year until KZMG launched Magic 93.1 in 1991, previously as a short-lived Adult Contemporary station.

In early 2013, along with branding changes at sister station KQFC, Cumulus adjusted the name of the station from Kissin' 92 to KISSIN 92.3.

On April 3, 2017, a staff shuffle happened between KIZN and sister station KQFC; KQFC afternoon host Rick Daniels over to KIZN for the same shift. Also, KIZN debuted a new logo.

On October 1, 2017, Shawnda McNeal  was hired to join market veteran Cory Mikhals on the KIZN morning shift. The morning show was rebranded as "Idaho's Morning Show".

References

External links
Official Website

IZN
Country radio stations in the United States
Cumulus Media radio stations
Radio stations established in 1968